Bernstorff is the name of an old and distinguished German-Danish noble family which originated from Mecklenburg. Members of the family held the title of Count/Countess, granted to them on 14.12.1767 by King Christian VII of Denmark.

Notable members 
 Andreas Gottlieb von Bernstorff (1649–1726), Hanoverian minister who accompanied George I to Britain when he became King
 Johann Hartwig Ernst von Bernstorff (1712–1772), Danish statesman
 Andreas Peter Bernstorff (1735–1797), Danish state minister
 Christian Günther von Bernstorff (1769–1835), Danish and Prussian statesman
 Joachim Frederik Bernstorff (1771–1835), Danish statesman
 Albrecht von Bernstorff (1809–1873), diplomat, Prussian Foreign Minister (1861–1862)
 Andreas Bernstorff (1811–1864), Danish military officer
 Berthold von Bernstorff (1842–1917), German politician and owner of Schiermonnikoog
 Percy von Bernstorff (1858–1930), German public official
 Johann Heinrich von Bernstorff (1862–1939), German diplomat
 Georg Ernst von Bernstorff (1870–1939), German politician
 Albrecht von Bernstorff, German diplomat and resistance fighter

See also
 Bernstorff Palace
 Bernstorff Fjord
 Bernstorff Glacier

References

External links
 
 Bernstorff family website (in German)
 Slægten Bernstorff (in Danish)
 

 
Danish noble families
German noble families
Mecklenburgian nobility
Danish people of German descent